Sentimental Killer is an album by Irish Mary Coughlan that was released by East West Records, a subsidiary of Warner Music Group.

The song "Magdalene Laundry", written by Johnny Mulhern, refers to the Magdalen Asylums run by the Roman Catholic Church in which Irish prostitutes, unmarried mothers, developmentally-challenged women, and abused girls were incarcerated indefinitely.

Track listing 
 "There is a Bed" (Marc Almond)
 "Hearts" (Jacques Brel)
 "Magdalen Laundry" (Johnny Mulhern)
 "Francis of Assisi" (Johnny Mulhern)
 "Love in the Shadows" (D. Long)
 "Ain't no Cure for Love" (Leonard Cohen)
 "Handbags and Gladrags" (Mike d'Abo)
 "Just a Friend of Mine" (Lambregt, Schoufs, Schoovanerts, Francois)
 "Ballad of a Sad Young Man" (Fran Landesman, Tommy Wolf)
 "Not up to Scratch" (Nijgh, De Groot)
 "Sentimental Killer" (Johnny Mulhern)

Personnel 
 Mary Coughlan – vocals
 Conor Barry – acoustic guitar, electric guitar
 James Delaney – organ, piano
 Allan Murray – accordion
 Davy Spillane – uilleann pipes
 Paul Moore – bass, double bass
 Peter McKinney – drums
 Noel Eccles – percussion
 Richie Buckley, Ciaran Wilde - saxophone
 Bas Kleine - mouth organ
 Karen Coleman, Rob Strong, Shelly Buckspan - backing vocals

References

1992 albums
Mary Coughlan (singer) albums